Aliyu Ahman Bahago (born 31 December 1964), is a Nigerian politician. He is the member of the federal house of representatives for EduMoro.

Early life
His father was former Minister of Health and Agriculture Ahman Pategi, during Ahmadu Bello, reign.

He attended primary school Patigi, and had a  WASC in Government Secondary School Ilorin 1976 -81. He completed Basic studies 1981–82. He obtained his BS'c on International Studies in Ahmadu Bello University1982-85. And his MS'c in  Political Economy and Development Studies in University of Abuja, 2000–02.

Career
He started as Chief Executive Officer for Platform Nigeria Limited, in Ahmann Patigi Farms. He served as Director at Tranex and Branch Chairman of Kwara State Red Cross Society. Aliyu Ahman Was Member Federal House of Representative at National, He was three time member of Edu Moro, Pategi, Federal constituency of Kwara North,. he was twice Chairman of the House Committee on Water Resources, and also Chairman, Legislative Budget Research. He was a member of other committees on Appropriation and Commerce.

References

Members of the House of Representatives (Nigeria)
Politicians from Kwara State
Living people
1964 births
All Progressives Congress politicians
Nigerian Muslims